Fraser John Balmain (born 16 November 1991) is an English rugby union prop forward who plays for Gloucester in the English Premiership.

Balmain joined Leicester in July 2010 after being released from Newcastle Falcons academy and turning down an academy contract from Northampton Saints.  On 12 November he made his Leicester debut from the bench during an Anglo-Welsh Cup game against Ospreys in Bridgend. He had to wait two years though to make his first start against the New Zealand Maori on 13 November 2012.

Balmain played as a replacement during the 2013 Premiership final as Leicester defeated Northampton Saints. 

In 2014 Balmain featured from the bench in an uncapped England match against the Barbarians.

On 10 January 2017, Balmain left Leicester to join Premiership rivals Gloucester ahead of the 2017-18 season.

References

External links 
 Leicester Tigers Profile

1991 births
Living people
Rugby union props
English rugby union players
Leicester Tigers players
Gloucester Rugby players
Rugby union players from Newcastle upon Tyne